Azanak may refer to:
 Azanak-e Kukya
 Azanak-e Olya